South Cowton Castle is a 15th-century fortified dwelling house in the Richmondshire district of North Yorkshire, England.  It is situated on the land that was once the medieval village of South Cowton. 

The castle was built by Sir Richard Conyers in 1470 and it is the oldest surviving building in any of the Cowtons. The castle was built at the time of the Wars of the Roses, which gives an indication of why what is a country gentleman's house is so heavily fortified.

The castle is a grade I listed building; it is situated near the 15th century St Mary's Church, and overlooks the field markings from the abandoned village of South Cowton.

The building is rectangular in plan, with two towers at the south western and north eastern corners. It is three storeyed with four-storey towers. The castle was altered in the 19th century and, after a roof-fall in 1979, repaired between 1980 and 1982.

The castle is now used as a private farmhouse, it can be found just off the B1263 road near Atley Hill.

References

External links and sources 

Buildings and structures completed in 1470
Houses completed in the 15th century
Grade I listed buildings in North Yorkshire
Grade I listed castles
Castles in North Yorkshire